The 9th FINA Swimming World Championships (25 m) were held at the Manchester Arena, in Manchester, United Kingdom 9–13 April 2008.

The United States topped the medal table with 10 gold medals, though host team Great Britain took home the most medals (24).

Medal summary

Key
 WR - World record
 ER - European record
 CR - Championship record

Men's events

Women's events

Medals table

See also
2008 in swimming

References
 FINA event webpages
 Official event website 
 Results from Omega Timing

 
FINA World Swimming Championships (25 m)
FINA Short Course World Championships
Swimming in England
International sports competitions in Manchester
S
FINA World Swimming Championships (25 m)
2000s in Manchester